Good Burger: Music From the Original Motion Picture is the soundtrack to Nickelodeon's 1997 comedy film Good Burger. It was released on July 15, 1997 through Capitol Records and composes of a blend of hip hop, R&B and rock music. The soundtrack was a minor success, making it to #101 on the Billboard 200 chart and #65 on the Top R&B/Hip-Hop Albums chart.

Track listing

Charts

References

External links 
 

1997 soundtrack albums
Hip hop soundtracks
Capitol Records soundtracks
Albums produced by Warren G
Albums produced by George Clinton (funk musician)
Albums produced by Troy Taylor (record producer)
Comedy film soundtracks